The Growing Tall Poppies Program was started by Eroia Barone-Nugent and Keith Nugent in 2008.
'Tall poppies’ describes people who rise above the  norm for achievement. And the purpose of the Growing Tall Poppies (GTP) program is to help young Australians to become these “tall Poppies” in science.

Collaboration
GTP is a collaboration between Santa Maria College in Northcote (Melbourne), Australia Research Council Centre of Excellence for Coherent Xray Science (CXS) and AKORN educational services. GTP is supported by the Catholic Education Office Melbourne (CEOM) and the National Australia Bank (NAB) schools first program.
Santa Maria College had a vision to ensure that all students are able to recognise their potential in all areas of their schooling.

Aim
The GTP program is focused on giving students in secondary school, mainly females, an authentic experience of the physical sciences.
Although the aim is mainly on females, the GTP program wants to give all students, males and females, the ability to exercise not only their curiosity, but also create knowledge and practise leadership and team-building skills. 
In the program the students are to gather data from experiments and then they are to analyse and publish the results on a public website. Through this, the students should use their curiosity to get a real idea of how the physical sciences can relate to the real world, and their future. The students get to talk to young PHD students, Professors and Postdocs, and get an idea of University life through the GTP program as well as learning about science.

Not only does the GTP program benefit students, it also benefits teachers through linking them with scientists. This would hopefully be transferred to the classroom and invigorate their teaching practice.

Hopefully through the GTP program, and connecting students with scientists, students will be more likely to stay enrolled in physics through year 12. This is a transformative contribution to increasing the pool of students who can feed into the STEM (science technology engineering and mathematics) areas in Australia.

Student feedback
The program is running successfully with students who have completed the program, saying things such as “An experience that you wouldn’t get elsewhere, it was challenging, exciting and different.” – Student, Age 16 years.

References

Education in Australia
Science and technology in Australia